Journal des dames et des modes, was a French fashion magazine, published between 1797 and 1839..    Until the 1820s, the magazine had almost international monopoly as a channel of French fashion worldwide.

History

It was the second oldest fashion magazine published in France, replacing its predecessor the Cabinet des Modes (1785-1793) after the fall of Robespierre. During most of its existence, it had near monopoly in the fashion world as the channel of French fashion in France as well as internationally, particularly during the Napoleonic age.  

It was edited by Pierre de la Mesangere, who was its main journalist most of its existence.  It was issued every five days, with eight pages of text and one or two colored copperplates (fashion plates). It also contained descripction of society life, poetry, theatre reviews and fiction.  The magazine was generously treated ny Napoleon I as he viewed fashion as an important French industry, and preferred it as the organ of French fashion before the previous fashion dolls, which he banned because of his fear that they could be used to conceal secret messages.   It was relatively inexpensive and affordable, and popular in almost all the Western world: from Paris to Boston, Britain, Holland, Italy, Belgium, Germany and Russia. Despite the impopularity of France during the Napoleonic wars, French fashion was still popular and ensure the fashion magazine's international success.  There were however many national fashion magazines produced with Journal des dames et des modes as its model. 

From the 1820s, the dominance of the magazine was broken with an increasing number of rivals when the French fashion magazine industry exploded with a number of rivaling magazines, such as the Petit courrier des dames (1821-1868), Le Follet (1829-1892), La Mode (1829-1854) and Le Journal des demoiselles (1833-1922), and Journal des dames et des modes finally discontinued in 1839.

Later magazine
Another magazine with the same name, Journal des dames et des modes, was published in 1912–14.

Gallery

References

1797 establishments in France
1839 disestablishments in France
Defunct magazines published in France
French-language magazines
Women's magazines published in France
Magazines established in 1797
Magazines disestablished in 1839
Magazines published in Paris
Women's fashion magazines